Luxembourg competed at the 2004 Summer Olympics in Athens, Greece, from 13 to 29 August 2004. The nation has competed at every Olympic games for a century, except the 1932 Summer Olympics in Los Angeles.

Luxembourgian Olympic and Sporting Committee sent the nation's largest delegation to the Games since the 1972 Summer Olympics in Munich. A total of 10 athletes, 6 men and 4 women, competed in 6 sports; most of them participated strongly in road cycling, swimming, and tennis. Notable Luxembourgian athletes featured road cyclist Fränk Schleck, triathlete Elizabeth May, and tennis star Claudine Schaul, who later became the nation's flag bearer in the opening ceremony.

Luxembourg failed to win an Olympic medal in Athens since the 1952 Summer Olympics in Helsinki, where middle-distance runner Josy Barthel took home the Olympic title in the men's 1500 metres.

Archery

One Luxembourgian archer qualifiedfor the men's individual archery.

Athletics

Luxembourgian athletes have so far achieved qualifying standards in the following athletics events (up to a maximum of 3 athletes in each event at the 'A' Standard, and 1 at the 'B' Standard).

Men

Cycling

Road
In the men's road race, Kirchen and Schleck finished in the main peloton of 34 riders, with Kirchen finishing 3rd in that group and 6th overall. Benoît Joachim was the only entrant in the time trial, but finished well back.

Swimming

Luxembourgian swimmers earned qualifying standards in the following events (up to a maximum of 2 swimmers in each event at the A-standard time, and 1 at the B-standard time):

Men

Women

Tennis

Anne Kremer and Claudine Schaul both lost their single matches in straight sets to higher ranking opponents, then paired up as a double team, and lost an upset to a wildcard entry from Colombia in three sets, including a tiebreak set and a 16-game final set.

Triathlon

Luxembourg again sent one triathlete to the Olympics.

References

External links
Official Report of the XXVIII Olympiad
Luxembourgian Olympic and Sporting Committee 

Nations at the 2004 Summer Olympics
2004 Summer Olympics
Summer Olympics